David Richard Tarrant (born 31 January 1937) is a New Zealand cricketer. He played in nine first-class matches for Central Districts from 1954 to 1958.

See also
 List of Central Districts representative cricketers

References

External links
 

1937 births
Living people
New Zealand cricketers
Central Districts cricketers
Cricketers from Palmerston North